During the 1999–2000 English football season, Preston North End F.C. competed in the Football League Second Division.

Season summary
In the 1999–2000 season, Preston finally made their return to the second tier of the Football League, after an absence of almost twenty years. Jon Macken, whom Gary Peters had signed from Manchester United two years previously, had a storming season scoring 22 league goals, his flair being reinforced by the team's solid spine of Teuvo Moilanen in goal, defenders Graham Alexander, Colin Murdock, Michael Jackson and Rob Edwards and a central midfield made up of workhorses Gregan and Rankine. Blackpool, who are Preston's archrivals got relegated to basement division the same season. This meant Preston took revenge from Blackpool after 30 years.

The championship was confirmed at Cambridge United on 24 April, a game which brought North End's seventh, and last, defeat of the season.

Final league table

Results
Preston North End's score comes first

Legend

Football League Second Division

FA Cup

League Cup

Football League Trophy

Squad

Left club during season

References

Preston North End F.C. seasons
Preston North End F.C.